KRKV (107.3 FM, "Variety Rock 107") is a radio station broadcasting a classic rock music format  and is licensed to Las Animas, Colorado, United States.  The station is currently owned by Alleycat Communications.

References

External links

RKV
Classic rock radio stations in the United States
Radio stations established in 1975